The High Command of the Military of Bolivia entrusted General Luis García Meza Tejada with the Presidency on 18 July 1980, and he formed his cabinet.

mil – military

ind – independent

ADN – Nationalist Democratic Action

Notes

Cabinets of Bolivia
Cabinets established in 1980
Cabinets disestablished in 1981
1980 establishments in Bolivia